Fiona-Elizabeth Hughes (born 5 March 1990) is an English cross-country skier from Huddersfield. She has competed in the World Cup since February 2010 and represented Great Britain at the 2009 World Championships and the 2010 Winter Olympics. Hughes is the only female British cross-country skier competing at the 2010 Olympics.

She finished 68th in the 10 km event at the 2010 Games while at the 2009 championships, Hughes finished 14th in the team sprint, 68th in the 10 km, 85th in the individual sprint, and was lapped in the 15 km mixed pursuit events. Her best World Cup finish was 60th in the individual sprint event at Canada in 2010.

She's currently reading Engineering at Queens' College, Cambridge.

References

External links 
 
 Fiona Hughes at British Olympic Association 

1990 births
Cross-country skiers at the 2010 Winter Olympics
English female cross-country skiers
Living people
Olympic cross-country skiers of Great Britain
Sportspeople from Huddersfield
Alumni of Queens' College, Cambridge
Competitors at the 2015 Winter Universiade